Chilo demotellus is a moth in the family Crambidae. It was described by Francis Walker in 1866. It is found in North America, where it has been recorded from Georgia, Maryland, New Jersey and South Carolina.

The wingspan is about 26 mm. Adults have been recorded on wing from April to August.

References

Chiloini
Moths described in 1866